Kevin Sheekey (born June 12, 1966) is an American businessman and political adviser. He is the Global Head of Communications, Government Relations and Marketing for Bloomberg L.P. He was the campaign manager for former New York City Mayor Mike Bloomberg's 2020 presidential campaign. Previously, Sheekey served as head of government relations and communications at Bloomberg L.P. and as chairman of Bloomberg Government. Sheekey also previously served as deputy mayor for government affairs for the City of New York under Mayor Michael R. Bloomberg. He is credited with managing Mayor Bloomberg's three successful campaigns for Mayor of New York.  In March 2020, the Atlantic called Sheekey "one of the sharpest political minds of his generation."

Personal life and education
Sheekey grew up in Washington, D.C. He lives in Manhattan with his wife, Robin, and their two children. He attended Washington University in St. Louis and Georgetown Day School.

He has two sisters, Megan Sheekey, who was the President of the Mayor's Fund to Advance New York City, and Kate Sheekey. His brother-in-law is Jim Caiola, a well-known restaurateur.

Professional career
From 1992 to 1997, Sheekey worked for New York Senator Daniel Patrick Moynihan, serving as press secretary, campaign manager for Moynihan's 1994 re-election campaign and eventually, the Senator's Chief of Staff. Including his time working for Sen. Moynihan, Sheekey spent a dozen years working for Democrats in Congress.

Sheekey was hired by Bloomberg L.P. in 1997 to work as the company's chief Washington lobbyist. He has been with Mike Bloomberg "since the beginning of his "political foray and has taken the lead in counseling him in the ways of politics." As part of the Bloomberg administration, Sheekey served as president of the New York Host Committee, the organization in charge of overseeing the Republican National Convention, and later, as Bloomberg's deputy mayor of government affairs.

Sheekey played a prominent role in developing projects such as PlaNYC and obtaining billions in school construction funds for New York City from state legislators. He is also known for exploring and organizing Bloomberg's potential presidential run in 2008. The mayor eventually opted to complete his second term rather than run for president.

Sheekey returned to Bloomberg L.P. in 2010 to oversee government relations and communications for the company and serve as chairman of Bloomberg Government, a subscription data service providing aggregated government news and analysis. He eventually rose within Bloomberg L.P. to the role of Global Head of Communications, Government Relations and Marketing. He is based part-time in London where he represents Bloomberg L.P.'s global business presence.

Sheekey serves on the board of the ONE Campaign, alongside the likes of U2's lead singer Bono, Sheryl Sandberg, John Doerr, Lawrence Summers, and Susan Buffett.

In May 2016, Sheekey became a board member of Tech:NYC, a non profit organization that represents the interest of New York City's technology sector through the support of member companies like Google, Bloomberg L.P., Uber, and Facebook.

In 2015, Sheekey began laying groundwork for Michael Bloomberg to run for president as an Independent candidate in the 2016 election. Sheekey worked with Democratic and Republican political strategists to map out staffing and messaging for the proposed campaign. Bloomberg formally announced he would not run on March 7, 2016, stating that there was too high of a risk his candidacy could lead to the election of Donald Trump or Senator Ted Cruz. Sheekey later advised on preparation and strategy for Bloomberg's primetime speech at the 2016 Democratic National Convention, during which Bloomberg endorsed Hillary Clinton for president. Sheekey told the New York Times during the campaign "Hillary [Clinton] has some baggage, but Trump is crazy. And you can't fix crazy."

It was reported that Sheekey was considering running in the 2017 New York City mayoral election against incumbent Bill de Blasio, but ultimately decided against entering the mayoral race to continue to focus on expanding former New York City three-term mayor Michael Bloomberg's global work with mayors around climate change and other issues.

In November 2019, Mike Bloomberg announced that he was running for president and named Sheekey his campaign manager. Sheekey had previously said that Bloomberg would have an advantage as a candidate — and would work to ensure any Democratic nominee would defeat the incumbent — because of his business acumen and technological knowledge. Sheekey said in February 2019, "Whether Mike runs or not, he really wants to advance the science of how you target voters...One of the country’s best technology entrepreneurs ever is going to make sure that whoever wins the Democratic nomination is going to all have the support they’ll need to win a general election and beat Trump.” 

Sheekey received the French Ordre national du mérite in April 2022. French Ambassador to the U.S. Philippe Etienne presented the honor on behalf of French President Emmanuel Macron. Ambassador Etienne cited Sheekey's promotion of Franco-American friendship and leadership on climate change.

Sheekey's political philosophy is compared to the military doctrine of former U.S. Secretary of State Colin Powell: "Use overwhelming force."

References

External links
 

1966 births
Living people
Bloomberg L.P. people
Washington University in St. Louis alumni
American political consultants
Politicians from New York City